Thym is a surname. Notable people with the surname include:

Georg Thym ( 1520–1560), German teacher, poet and writer
Jennifer Thym, American writer, film director and producer